Before the Acts of Union 1707, the barons of the shire of Aberdeen elected commissioners to represent them in the unicameral Parliament of Scotland and in the Convention of the Estates. The number of commissioners was increased from two to four in 1690.

From 1708 Aberdeenshire was represented by one Member of Parliament in the House of Commons of Great Britain.

List of shire commissioners

 1596: John Leslie of Balquhain and Alexander Fraser of Fraserburgh 
 1612–17: Alexander Gordon of Cluny
 1629: Erskine of Balhagardie and Crombie of Kemnay 
 1631, 1632: Irvine of Drum  
 1639–41, 1644, 1645–46: Sir William Forbes of Craigievar and Fintray
 1643, 1648, 1661–63: Sir Alexander Fraser of Philorth
 1648: The Laird of Udny  (Udny) 
 1649–50: Arthur Forbes of Eight 
 1649–50: William Forbes the younger of Leslie 
 1650–51: The Laird of Glenkindlie (Strachan) 
 1661–63: Colonel George Keith of Aden 
 1665 (convention), 1667 (convention): Sir John Baird of Newbyth
 1665 (convention), 1667 (convention), 1669–74, 1678 (convention): Adam Urquhart of Meldrum 
 1669–74, 1678 (convention), 1681–82: Sir George Gordon of Haddo
 1681–82, 1685–86: Sir Alexander Seton of Pitmedden
 1685–86: Sir Charles Maitland of Pittrichie
 1689 (convention), 1689–1701: Sir John Forbes of Craigievar and Fintray
 1689 (convention), 1689–1701, 1702–07: James Moir of Stoniewood  
 1693–98, 1700–01: Sir Samuel Forbes of Foveran
 1693–1702: Sir James Elphinstone of Logie
 1702–07: Sir William Seton of Pitmedden
 1702–07: Sir Alexander Gordone of Pitlurg 
 1702–07: John Udnie of that Ilk

References

See also
 List of constituencies in the Parliament of Scotland at the time of the Union

Shires represented in the Parliament of Scotland (to 1707)
Constituencies disestablished in 1707
1707 disestablishments in Scotland
Politics of Aberdeenshire
History of Aberdeenshire